The 2021–22 Big East Conference men's basketball season began with practices in October 2021, followed by the start of the 2021–22 NCAA Division I men's basketball season in November. Conference play began in January 2022 and ended in March. The conference champions were the Providence Friars and the season MVP was Collin Gillespie.

References

External links
Big East website